The Wave-class tankers are a class of fast fleet tankers in service with the Royal Fleet Auxiliary. The class is tasked with providing fuel, food, fresh water, ammunition and other supplies to Royal Navy vessels around the world. The two vessels have seen service in a number of locations, including anti-drug and hurricane relief operations in the Caribbean Sea, anti-piracy activities around the Horn of Africa, and deterrent patrols in the South Atlantic. As of early 2022, both ships were earmarked for "extended readiness" status (i.e. uncrewed reserve).

History

A contract was placed for the vessels in 1997 with Vickers Shipbuilding and Engineering Ltd (Marconi Marine VSEL). Construction of Wave Knight began in 1998 at VSEL's Barrow-in-Furness yard and the ship was launched in 2000. With the acquisition of Marconi Electronic Systems and its Marconi Marine subsidiary in 1999 British Aerospace became BAE Systems. BAE now owns VSEL in Barrow and the Yarrow and Govan shipyards on the Clyde. BAE transferred the construction of Wave Ruler to Govan in 2000 and the vessel was launched in 2001. Both vessels were commissioned in 2003.

Design

The ships have the capability to supply fuel and other liquid cargo to vessels using replenishment rigs on port and starboard beams and through a Hudson reel-type stern rig. When providing support for amphibious operations, the ships are also able to deliver fuel to dracones positioned alongside. The equipment load includes cranes (for stores handling and abeam replenishment), steering and rudder gear, thyristor-controlled winch/windlasses and double drum mooring winches.

The vessels were designed with double hulls to prevent or reduce environmental pollution from oil spills if damage is sustained to the outer hull.

The ships can operate a Merlin HM1 helicopter, or other helicopters of similar size, from a hangar and flight deck at the stern. On deployments to Atlantic Patrol Task (N) they have typically embarked a Royal Navy Lynx or a United States Coast Guard helicopter.

The vessels have a standard crew of 80 Royal Fleet Auxiliary personnel with provision for a further 22 Royal Navy personnel to conduct helicopter and weapons systems operations. They carry a full medical team and sick bay and are capable of distributing 2,000 emergency relief packages in times of crisis.

Construction programme

Future
In June 2018 it was reported by the Brazilian press that the UK MoD had offered to sell one or both of the Wave-class tankers to Brazil. As early as 2010, BAE Systems had proposed providing Brazil with a variant of the Wave-class, tailored to meet the specific aviation, stores and personnel requirements of the Brazilian Navy.

As of June 2020, Wave Ruler was reported to be in reduced readiness but maintained in good condition and available for reactivation.

In February 2022, it was reported that both tankers would be placed in "extended readiness" (uncrewed reserve).

Gallery

References

External links
Video of RFA Wave Ruler (A390) near Plymouth on 9 October 2009.

Auxiliary replenishment ship classes
 
 Wave Knight
Auxiliary ships of the United Kingdom